IndieWebCamp is a technology BarCamp that was founded in Portland, Oregon and has since been held all over the world, including at the offices of the New York Times and in Brighton, England. It describes itself as a 2-day creator camp focused on growing the independent web, and spawned the IndieWeb movement.

The event was founded by Tantek Çelik, Amber Case, Crystal Beasley and Aaron Parecki, with an aim to empower everyone to publish to their own websites, while still reaching their contacts on "silo" sites like Twitter and Facebook.

While the attendees of the original events were largely technologists; journalists, bloggers and media professionals have begun to attend in order to gain greater control over their own content online.

IndieWebCamp 2014 

IndieWebCamp 2014 was held simultaneously in Portland, OR, New York, NY, and Berlin, Germany. Attendees spoke to each other over WebRTC video chat, and collaborated on hackathon projects.

References

External links 
 IndieWebCamp official page

Events in Oregon
Recurring events established in 2011
Web-related conferences
Unconferences